The 2003 Nova Scotia general election was held on August 5, 2003 to elect members of the 59th House of Assembly of the Province of Nova Scotia, Canada. The ruling Progressive Conservative Party, led by Premier John Hamm, was reduced to a minority government.

Campaign
The election was called by Progressive Conservatives, who decided to hold a rare summer election in the hope of strengthening their hold on the legislature.  Running against them were the New Democratic Party (NDP), led by Darrell Dexter, and the Liberal Party, led by Danny Graham.

Hamm's party ran on a policy of fiscal management, tax cuts, and on their record of fulfilling most of their promises. While the NDP agreed in principle to tax cuts, their main cause was the creation of a public auto insurance company. The Liberals were the only party to criticize the tax cuts.

For the most part, the campaign was quiet and uneventful.  Hamm received criticism for a great number of spending programs, including a $150 tax rebate cheque sent to Nova Scotians right before the election.  The party was also criticized for holding an election in the summer when most people have other concerns.  Darrell Dexter's friendly, non-confrontational style, was popular with many voters, and was a marked change from his party's usually strident socialism.  Danny Graham, a young leader, was popular, but failed to make much of a mark.

The election was considered a mild failure for the Liberals and Progressive 
Conservatives, and something of a success for the NDP.

This election is also notable for being one of the last Canadian provincial elections in which British subjects could vote (a tiny number can still vote provincially in Saskatchewan if they were qualified in 1971).

General results

Results by party

 The Marijuana Party did not contest the 1999 general election.

Results by region

Retiring incumbents
Liberal
Don Downe, Lunenburg West
Jim Smith, Cole Harbour-Eastern Passage
Paul MacEwan, Cape Breton Nova

Progressive Conservative
Neil LeBlanc, Argyle
Muriel Baillie, Pictou West

New Democratic
Robert Chisholm, Halifax Atlantic
John Holm, Sackville-Cobequid

Nominated candidates
Legend
bold denotes party leader
† denotes an incumbent who is not running for re-election or was defeated in nomination contest

Valley

|-
|bgcolor=whitesmoke|Annapolis
|
|Frank Chipman 2,79531.42%
|
|Adrian Nette 1,39515.68%
||
|Stephen McNeil 4,52250.83%
|
|Harry Wilson 1852.08%
|
|
|
|
||
|Frank Chipman
|-
|bgcolor=whitesmoke|Clare
|
|Marc Boudreau 1,45625.26%
|
|Don Melanson 76013.19%
||
|Wayne Gaudet 3,54761.55%
|
|
|
|
|
|
||
|Wayne Gaudet
|-
|bgcolor=whitesmoke|Digby-Annapolis
|
|Gordon Balser2,33939.98%
|
|Deborah Trask 75512.90%
||
|Harold Theriault 2,66645.56%
|
|Gordon D. Reid911.56%
|
|
|
|
||
|Gordon Balser
|-
|bgcolor=whitesmoke|Hants West
||
|Ron Russell3,87146.15%
|
|Sean Bennett 2,20026.23%
|
|Randy Matheson 2,11825.25%
|
|Connie Brauer510.61%
|
|Chummy Anthony 1481.76%
|
|
||
|Ron Russell
|-
|bgcolor=whitesmoke|Kings North
||
|Mark Parent 4,06350.20%
|
|Jim Morton 2,34028.91%
|
|Michael Landry 1,53318.94%
|
|
|
|Ben Friesen 1571.94%
|
|
||
|Mark Parent
|-
|bgcolor=whitesmoke|Kings South
||
|David Morse3,34737.65%
|
|David Mangle 2,79431.43%
|
|Maura Ryan 2,68230.17%
|
|Victor Harris 670.75%
|
|
|
|
||
|David Morse
|-
|bgcolor=whitesmoke|Kings West
|
|Jon Carey 2,92935.51%
|
|Greg Hubbert 2,27527.58%
||
|Leo Glavine 3,04536.91%
|
|
|
|
|
|
||
|Jon Carey
|}

South Shore

|-
|bgcolor=whitesmoke|Argyle
||
|Chris d'Entremont 2,34547.99%
|
|Charles Muise 59512.18%
|
|Aldric Benoit d'Entremont1,94639.83%
|
|
|
|
|
|
||
|Neil LeBlanc †
|-
|bgcolor=whitesmoke|Chester-St. Margaret's
||
|John Chataway 3,45137.30%
|
|Hinrich Bitter-Suermann 3,41236.87%
|
|Mitt Larsen 2,24924.31%
|
|Sue Gault 1411.52%
|
|
|
|
||
|John Chataway
|-
|bgcolor=whitesmoke|Lunenburg
||
|Michael Baker3,73446.36%
|
|Chris Heide 2,62532.59%
|
|Jim Davis 1,69521.05%
|
|
|
|
|
|
||
|Michael Baker
|-
|bgcolor=whitesmoke|Lunenburg West
||
|Carolyn Bolivar-Getson 3,11139.68%
|
|David Ferguson2,18027.80%
|
|John MacDonald 2,55032.52%
|
|
|
|
|
|
||
|Don Downe †
|-
|bgcolor=whitesmoke|Queens
||
|Kerry Morash2,72144.19%
|
|Vicki Conrad 2,30037.35%
|
|Win Seaton 1,13718.46%
|
|
|
|
|
|
||
|Kerry Morash
|-
|bgcolor=whitesmoke|Shelburne
||
|Cecil O'Donnell 3,70248.59%
|
|Kendall Stoddard 81010.63%
|
|Clifford Huskilson 3,10740.78%
|
|
|
|
|
|
||
|Cecil O'Donnell
|-
|bgcolor=whitesmoke|Yarmouth
||
|Richard Hurlburt4,65656.48%
|
|Gillian Rowley 1,14213.85%
|
|Phil DeMille 2,44629.67%
|
|
|
|
|
|
||
|Richard Hurlburt
|}

Fundy-Northeast

|-
|bgcolor=whitesmoke|Colchester-Musquodoboit Valley
||
|Brooke Taylor 4,69564.34%
|
|Kathryn Belzer 1,69423.22%
|
|Joan Barnhill 90812.44%
|
|
|
|
|
|
||
|Brooke Taylor
|-
|bgcolor=whitesmoke|Colchester North
||
|Bill Langille 3,32445.12%
|
|Garfield Forrest 1,86025.25%
|
|John Davidson 2,18329.63%
|
|
|
|
|
|
||
|Bill Langille
|-
|bgcolor=whitesmoke|Cumberland North
||
|Ernie Fage4,60961.95%
|
|Kim Cail 1,10514.85%
|
|Marsh G. Fox1,38918.67%
|
|
|
|
|
|Jason Blanch 3374.53%
||
|Ernie Fage
|-
|bgcolor=whitesmoke|Cumberland South
||
|Murray Scott4,89871.69%
|
|Scott McKee 74510.90%
|
|Harriet McCready1,18917.40%
|
|
|
|
|
|
||
|Murray Scott
|-
|bgcolor=whitesmoke|Hants East
|
|Mary Lou LeRoy 1,64019.54%
||
|John MacDonell 4,78356.97%
|
|Larry Matthews 1,86622.23%
|
|Ken Smith 1061.26%
|
|
|
|
||
|John MacDonell
|-
|bgcolor=whitesmoke|Truro-Bible Hill
||
|Jamie Muir3,86247.11%
|
|Jim Harpell 2,31428.23%
|
|Jeff Yuill 2,02124.66%
|
|
|
|
|
|
||
|Jamie Muir
|}

Central Halifax

|-
|bgcolor=whitesmoke|Halifax Chebucto
|
|Sandy Phillips 1,98323.72%
||
|Howard Epstein 3,68244.04%
|
|Kenzie MacKinnon 2,59231.00%
|
|Scott Higgins 1031.23%
|
|
|
|
||
|Howard Epstein
|-
|bgcolor=whitesmoke|Halifax Citadel
|
|Jane Purves2,46630.27%
|
|Peter Delefes 2,54231.20%
||
|Danny Graham 3,04237.34%
|
|James A. C. Marchoine380.47%
|
|Michael R. Patriquen 590.72%
|
|
||
|Jane Purves
|-
|bgcolor=whitesmoke|Halifax Clayton Park
|
|Mary Ann McGrath 3,03434.37%
|
|Roberta Morrison2,31226.19%
||
|Diana Whalen 3,32937.71%
|
|
|
|
|
|Greg Lavern 1521.72%
||
|Mary Ann McGrath
|-
|bgcolor=whitesmoke|Halifax Fairview
|
|Bruce MacCharles 1,68422.45%
||
|Graham Steele 3,43945.85%
|
|Susan Hayes 2,28430.45%
|
|David F. Boyd941.25%
|
|
|
|
||
|Graham Steele
|-
|bgcolor=whitesmoke|Halifax Needham
|
|Linda Carvery 1,37718.66%
||
|Maureen MacDonald 3,70950.26%
|
|Mike Rogers 2,17829.51%
|
|Blair Baxter 1161.57%
|
|
|
|
||
|Maureen MacDonald
|}

Suburban Halifax

|-
|bgcolor=whitesmoke|Bedford
||
|Peter G. Christie4,11443.87%
|
|Bob Watson 2,05521.92%
|
|Richard Zurawski 3,20834.21%
|
|
|
|
|
|
||
|Peter G. Christie
|-
|bgcolor=whitesmoke|Halifax Atlantic
|
|Linda Mosher 2,99633.68%
||
|Michele Raymond3,32737.40%
|
|Ian MacKinnon 2,38226.78%
|
|Gerald Rodgers 1912.15%
|
|
|
|
||
|Robert Chisholm †
|-
|bgcolor=whitesmoke|Hammonds Plains Upper Sackville
||
|Barry Barnet3,32241.14%
|
|Brenda Haley 2,22927.60%
|
|Pam Streeter 2,41929.96%
|
|
|
|Melanie Patriquen 1051.30%
|
|
||
|Barry Barnet
|-
|bgcolor=whitesmoke|Sackville-Cobequid
|
|John Giannakos 2,42628.37%
||
|Dave Wilson 3,88145.39%
|
|Bob Harvey 2,14725.11%
|
|
|
|Michael D. Patriquen 971.13%
|
|
||
|John Holm †
|-
|bgcolor=whitesmoke|Timberlea-Prospect
|
|Barry Fraser 1,53518.25%
||
|Bill Estabrooks5,04960.01%
|
|Bruce Holland 1,82921.74%
|
|
|
|
|
|
||
|Bill Estabrooks
|-
|bgcolor=whitesmoke|Waverley-Fall River-Beaver Bank
||
|Gary Hines 3,14137.67%
|
|Percy Paris 2,77833.31%
|
|David E. Merrigan2,24026.86%
|
|Heather Sawers 941.13%
|
|Alex Neron 861.03%
|
|
||
|Gary Hines
|}

Dartmouth/Cole Harbour/Eastern Shore

|-
|bgcolor=whitesmoke|Cole Harbour
|
|Brian Thomas 2,38726.55%
||
|Darrell Dexter 4,97755.37%
|
|Peter Foy 1,52316.94%
|
|Jessica Gould 1021.13%
|
|
|
|
||
|Darrell Dexter
|-
|bgcolor=whitesmoke|Cole Harbour-Eastern Passage
|
|Henry McInroy 1,64124.02%
||
|Kevin Deveaux3,99758.50%
|
|Brian Churchill 1,12116.41%
|
|Kallee A. McPherson741.08%
|
|
|
|
||
|Kevin Deveaux
|-
|bgcolor=whitesmoke|Dartmouth East
|
|Terry Degen 3,10734.80%
||
|Joan Massey 3,27236.65%
|
|Debra Barlow 2,32126.00%
|
|Scott Anderson 981.10%
|
|Hugo St-Onge 1011.13%
|
|Sebastien Theriault 280.31%
||
|Jim Smith †
|-
|bgcolor=whitesmoke|Dartmouth North
|
|Jane MacKay 1,90026.54%
||
|Jerry Pye 3,79953.06%
|
|Rosemary Godin 1,30018.16%
|
|Pat Gould 861.20%
|
|Marc-Andre Roy751.05%
|
|
||
|Jerry Pye
|-
|bgcolor=whitesmoke|Dartmouth South-Portland Valley
|
|Tim Olive2,81331.70%
||
|Marilyn More3,84443.31%
|
|Collin A. MacEachern2,21824.99%
|
|
|
|
|
|
||
|Tim Olive
|-
|bgcolor=whitesmoke|Eastern Shore
||
|Bill Dooks3,07345.02%
|
|Sid Prest 2,42735.56%
|
|Randy Carter 1,32619.43%
|
|
|
|
|
|
||
|Bill Dooks
|-
|bgcolor=whitesmoke|Preston
|
|David Hendsbee 1,36132.77%
|
|Douglas Sparks1,33132.05%
||
|Keith Colwell 1,41133.98%
|
|
|
|Marc-Boris St-Maurice501.20%
|
|
||
|David Hendsbee
|}

Central Nova

|-
|bgcolor=whitesmoke|Antigonish
||
|Angus MacIsaac4,25641.64%
|
|Terry O'Toole 1,75517.17%
|
|David Allister Cameron3,65035.71%
|
|
|
|Gene Purdy 5605.48%
|
|
||
|Angus MacIsaac
|-
|bgcolor=whitesmoke|Guysborough-Sheet Harbour
||
|Ron Chisholm2,58737.99%
|
|Jim Boudreau 2,02329.71%
|
|Gordon MacDonald 2,19932.30%
|
|
|
|
|
|
||
|Ron Chisholm
|-
|bgcolor=whitesmoke|Pictou Centre
||
|John Hamm 4,26254.70%
|
|Alexander MacIsaac 1,57120.16%
|
|Tim Daley 1,78922.96%
|
|
|
|Darryl Gallivan 1702.18%
|
|
||
|John Hamm
|-
|bgcolor=whitesmoke|Pictou East
||
|Jim DeWolfe3,29544.15%
|
|Bob Matheson 1,92925.85%
|
|John Fraser 2,23930.00%
|
|
|
|
|
|
||
|Jim DeWolfe
|-
|bgcolor=whitesmoke|Pictou West
|
|Paul Veniot 2,53032.68%
||
|Charlie Parker 3,41044.05%
|
|Ed MacMaster 1,63921.17%
|
|
|
|
|
|Doug Corbett 1632.11%
||
|Muriel Baillie †
|}

Cape Breton

|-
|bgcolor=whitesmoke|Cape Breton Centre
|
|Rita Tighe-MacLeod3734.81%
||
|Frank Corbett 3,92950.64%
|
|Basil McGillivray 3,45644.55%
|
|
|
|
|
|
||
|Frank Corbett
|-
|bgcolor=whitesmoke|Cape Breton North
||
|Cecil Clarke3,75443.46%
|
|Cecil Snow 1,71419.84%
|
|Mike White 3,16936.69%
|
|
|
|
|
|
||
|Cecil Clarke
|-
|bgcolor=whitesmoke|Cape Breton Nova
|
|Todd Marsman 6849.85%
||
|Gordie Gosse 3,16845.61%
|
|Mel Crowe 3,09444.54%
|
|
|
|
|
|
||
|Paul MacEwan †
|-
|bgcolor=whitesmoke|Cape Breton South
|
|John Morrison 1,67717.27%
|
|Mike MacSween 2,75928.41%
||
|Manning MacDonald5,27554.32%
|
|
|
|
|
|
||
|Manning MacDonald
|-
|bgcolor=whitesmoke|Cape Breton West
|
|Ivan Doncaster 2,22125.51%
|
|Douglas MacKinlay 1,86821.46%
||
|Russell MacKinnon 4,61653.03%
|
|
|
|
|
|
||
|Russell MacKinnon
|-
|bgcolor=whitesmoke|Glace Bay
|
|Mark Bettens 1,35116.65%
|
|Vince Hall 2,34228.87%
||
|Dave Wilson4,42054.48%
|
|
|
|
|
|
||
|Dave Wilson
|-
|bgcolor=whitesmoke|Inverness
||
|Rodney MacDonald5,39851.19%
|
|Tim Murphy 1,27712.11%
|
|Debbie Gillis 3,87136.71%
|
|
|
|
|
|
||
|Rodney MacDonald
|-
|bgcolor=whitesmoke|Richmond
|
|Richie Cotton 1,85031.18%
|
|Clair Rankin 1,03617.46%
||
|Michel Samson 3,04751.36%
|
|
|
|
|
|
||
|Michel Samson
|-
|bgcolor=whitesmoke|Victoria-The Lakes
|
|Keith Bain 2,03632.48%
|
|Nancy MacKeigan 93414.90%
||
|Gerald Sampson 2,28436.44%
|
|
|
|
|
|Brian Boudreau75011.97%Stemer MacLeod2644.21%
||
|Brian Boudreau
|}

See also
List of Nova Scotia general elections
List of Nova Scotia political parties

References

Further reading

External links
CBC Nova Scotia Votes 2003
Halifax Herald 2003 election website via Internet Archive.

Nova Scotia general
2003
General election
Nova Scotia gNova Scotia general election